Piper borbonense is a species of plant in the genus Piper.  A close relative of black pepper, its berries are used as a spice known as voatsiperifery, which comes from voa, the Malagasy word for fruit, and tsiperifery, the local name of the plant. A wild pepper, it grows in Madagascar.
It can reach up to 20 metres and needs a natural plant support.

References

External links
 http://plants.jstor.org/flora/floc012468

borbonense
Endemic flora of Madagascar
Spices
Taxa named by Casimir de Candolle